The 2021–22 UEFA Futsal Champions League was the 36th edition of Europe's premier club futsal tournament, and the 21st edition organized by UEFA. It was also the fourth edition since the tournament was rebranded from "UEFA Futsal Cup" to UEFA Futsal Champions League.

Sporting CP, the title holders, entered in the main round. They lost 4–0 in the final against Barcelona, who won their fourth title.

Association team allocation
A total of 55 teams from 51 of the 55 UEFA member associations participated in the 2021–22 UEFA Futsal Champions League. The association ranking based on the UEFA futsal national team coefficients was used to determine the number of participating teams for each association:
Associations 1–3 (since the title holders were in the top three) each had two teams qualify.
The winners of the 2020–21 UEFA Futsal Champions League qualified automatically and it's association may have entered a second team. If the title-holders' association was among the three best ranked associations, the 4th ranked association was also entitled to enter a second team.
The remaining associations had one team qualify.

Association ranking
The UEFA futsal national team coefficients at the end of April 2020, used to determine the number of teams each association was entitled to enter, was as follows.

Notes
TH – Additional berth for title holders
NR – No rank (association national team had been inactive on the previous 36 months)
DNE – Did not enter

Distribution
For the 2021–22 UEFA Futsal Champions League, the clubs' entry round was determined by their UEFA futsal club coefficients, which took into account their performance from the previous three seasons.
The following was the access list for the season.

Teams
Below were the participating teams of the 2021–22 UEFA Futsal Champions League (with their ranking among participating teams), grouped by their starting round and path for the main round.

Format
In this season, the tournament returned to the mini-tournament format consisting of three qualifying rounds and the final tournament. The qualifying rounds consisted of the following stages:
Preliminary round: 32 teams entering in this round were divided in eight groups of four teams with the winners and the best runners-up advancing to the next round.
Main round:
Path A: 16 teams entering in this round were divided in four groups of four teams, with the winners, runners-up and third-placed teams advancing to the next round.
Path B: 7 teams which entered in this round and the 9 teams advancing from the preliminary round were divided in four groups of four teams, with the winners advancing to the next round.
Elite round: 16 teams were divided in four groups of four teams, with the winners qualifying to the final tournament.
In each group, teams played against each other in a single round-robin format hosted by one of the participating teams.

The final tournament was played at a centralized location and consisted of single-legged semi-finals, third-place play-off and final. If scores were level at the end of normal time, extra time was played, followed by a penalty shoot-out if the scores remained tied.

Tiebreakers
Teams were ranked according to points (3 points for a win, 1 point for a draw, 0 points for a loss). If two or more teams were tied on points, the following tiebreaking criteria were applied, in the order given, to determine the rankings (see Article 14 Equality of points – mini-tournaments, Regulations of the UEFA Futsal Champions League):
Points in head-to-head matches among the tied teams;
Goal difference in head-to-head matches among the tied teams;
Goals scored in head-to-head matches among the tied teams;
If more than two teams were tied, and after applying all head-to-head criteria above, a subset of teams are still tied, all head-to-head criteria above were reapplied exclusively to this subset of teams;
Goal difference in all group matches;
Goals scored in all group matches;
Disciplinary points (direct red card = 3 points; double yellow card = 3 points; single yellow card = 1 point);
UEFA futsal club coefficients.

For the ranking of second-placed teams in the preliminary round, teams are also ranked according to points, with the following tiebreakers applying in case of a tie.
Goal difference in all group matches;
Goals scored in all group matches;
Disciplinary points (direct red card = 3 points; double yellow card = 3 points; single yellow card = 1 point);
UEFA futsal club coefficients.

Schedule
The schedule of the competition was as follows (all draws were held at the UEFA headquarters in Nyon, Switzerland).

Preliminary round
The draw for the preliminary round was held on 7 July 2021, 14:00 CEST. The preliminary round was played from 21 to 25 October 2021. The winners of each group and the best runners-up advanced to the main round Path B.

Times are CET (UTC+1), as listed by UEFA (local times, if different, are in parentheses).

Seeding
A total of 32 teams played in the preliminary round. Seeding of teams was based on their 2021 UEFA futsal club coefficients. Eight teams were pre-selected as hosts and were first drawn from a separate pot to their corresponding seeding position. The remaining teams were then drawn from their respective pots to their corresponding seeding position. Due to political reasons, teams from Kosovo and Serbia could not be drawn into the same group.

Notes
H – Mini-tournament hosts

Group A

Group B

Group C

Group D

Group E

Group F

Group G

Group H

Ranking of second-placed teams

Main round
The draw for the main round was held on 30 August 2021, 14:00 CEST. The main round was played from 26 to 31 October 2021.

Seeding
A total of 32 teams played in the main round. They were divided in two paths:
Path A (16 teams): the title holders and teams ranked 1–11 and 16–19.
Path B (16 teams): teams ranked 12–15 and 20-22 and 9 teams advancing form the preliminary round.

Seeding of teams was based on their 2021 UEFA futsal club coefficients. On Path B, the seeding position 3 and 4 were drawn from the same pot, comprising all teams advancing from the preliminary round, with the exception of Luxol St Andrews, who attributed to seeding position 2 as top ranked team advancing from the previous round. Eight teams (four in each path) were pre-selected as hosts and were first drawn from a separate pot to their corresponding seeding position. The remaining teams were then drawn from their respective pots to their corresponding seeding position. Teams from Kosovo and Serbia, Kosovo and Bosnia and Herzegovina or Armenia and Azerbaijan could not be drawn into the same group. Additionally, winners and runners-up from the same preliminary round advancing to the main round could not be drawn into the same group.

Notes
H – Mini-tournament hosts

Path A
The top three teams of each group in Path A advanced to the elite round.

Group 1

Group 2

Group 3

Group 4

Path B
The winners of each group in Path B advanced to the elite round.

Group 5

Group 6

Group 7

Group 8

Elite round 
The draw for the elite round was held on 3 November 2021, 14:00 CET. The elite round was played from 30 November to 5 December 2021.

Seeding
A total of 16 teams played in the elite round. Seeding of teams was based on their results in the previous round:
Seeding position 1: main round path A group winners.
Seeding position 2: main round path A runners-up.
Seeding positions 3 and 4 (drawn from the same pot): main round path A third-placed teams and path B group winners.
Four teams were pre-selected as hosts and were first drawn from a separate pot to their corresponding seeding position. Teams from Ukraine and Russia could not be drawn into the same group. Additionally, winners and runners-up from the same main round path A group could not be drawn into the same group.

Notes
H – Mini-tournament hosts

Group A

Group B

Group C

Group D

Final tournament
The final tournament consisted of two semifinals, a third-place play-off and a final, and was contested by the last four remaining teams from 29 April to 1 May 2022 at Arena Riga in Latvia.

Bracket

Semi-finals

Third place

Final

References

External links

2021–22
Champions League
August 2021 sports events in Europe
October 2021 sports events in Europe
December 2021 sports events in Europe
Sports events affected by the 2022 Russian invasion of Ukraine